Yakiv Anatoliyovych Zalevskyi (born 30 May 1980) is a Ukrainian professional football coach and former player.

External links

1980 births
Living people
Sportspeople from Volgograd
Ukrainian footballers
Ukrainian expatriate footballers
Association football midfielders
Expatriate footballers in Moldova
Expatriate footballers in Russia
Expatriate footballers in Belarus
FC Tekstilshchik Kamyshin players
FC Sheriff Tiraspol players
FC Torpedo-BelAZ Zhodino players
Ukrainian expatriate sportspeople in Moldova
FC Tiraspol players
Ukrainian expatriate sportspeople in Belarus
FC Minsk players
FC Vitebsk players
FC Gomel players
FC Dnepr Mogilev players
FC Granit Mikashevichi players
FC Isloch Minsk Raion players
FC Krumkachy Minsk players
FC Sakhalin Yuzhno-Sakhalinsk players
FC Dnister Ovidiopol players
Ukrainian First League players
Ukrainian Second League players
FC Krumkachy Minsk managers
Ukrainian football managers